Kaiwara Mahathme is a 1961 Indian Kannada-language film,  directed by  T. V. Singh Thakur and produced by Kaiwara Films (Pvt) Ltd.. The film stars Rajkumar, Narasimharaju, Balakrishna and G. V. Iyer. The film has musical score by G. K. Venkatesh.

Cast

Rajkumar
Narasimharaju
Balakrishna
G. V. Iyer
K. S. Ashwath
H. R. Shastry
Bharadwaj
Girimaji
Krishna Shastry
Kuppuraj
M. Bhagavathar
Srikanth
Basappa
Ramaraja Urs
Suresh
Leelavathi
M. Jayashree
Papamma
Shanthamma
Jayalakshmi
Padmamma
Indrani
Kumari Jaya
Kumari
Revathi
Vijayakumari
Shakunthala

References

External links
 

1961 films
1960s Kannada-language films
Films scored by G. K. Venkatesh